Laricobius erichsoni is a species of tooth-necked fungus beetle in the family Derodontidae. It is found in Europe and Northern Asia (excluding China) and North America.

References

Further reading

 

Derodontidae
Articles created by Qbugbot
Beetles described in 1846